My Watch is a memoir written by former Nigerian president Olusengun Obasanjo. It is a three-volume autobiography that gives detailed account of his early life and military career, political and public affair and touched on other national issues. In the book, Obasanjo wrote about several Nigerian political leaders and their leadership capacity including his own vice president Atiku Abubakar and president Goodluck Jonathan. He described his former vice president Atiku Abubakar whom they ruled Nigeria together from 1999 to 2007 as a corrupt, shameless and blatant liar. Obasanjo wrote of president Goodluck Jonathan as a man of adequate intelligence to lead Nigeria but lacking in self-confidence, broad vision and knowledge to moved Nigeria forward on a fast trajectory. In Volume 3 of the book, Obasanjo denied knowledge of the circumstances of the death of his wife Stella and dispelled the rumor that he used his wife for ritual sacrifice for success in his job as president.

Summary 

The Volume 1 of My Watch gives pre-colonial history of the author’s hometown of Owu, the history of formative years of Abeokuta, the colonial era and the condition of his own birth, early life and military career. The author narrated his experience during the Nigerian civil war as a military commander and the situation leading to his emergence as military head of state in 1976 up to the time, he handed power to a democratically elected president in 1979.

Volume 2 focused on the author’s civil rule from 1999 to 2007 and major political issues during the period. Obasanjo rated himself and his government very high in character and performance and absolved himself of all allegations of using his office as president for personal interest. He denied using his office to manipulate the national assembly to amend the Nigerian constitution to extend presidential term limit from two to three terms which would have allowed him to stay longer in office. Though he admitted knowing about the ‘third term’ campaign, he stated that it was not his own agenda or intention but that of governors who told him to go on because they would benefit from it. He accused his vice president Atiku Abubakar he regarded as influential as the arrowhead in the third term allegation and described him as “a blatant and shameless liar”.

Goodluck Jonathan and his presidency were criticised and rated low. Obasanjo wrote that after observing and listening to Jonathan and his political associates his conclusion was that Jonathan lacked capacity to be number one citizen of Nigeria. He stated that Jonathan might wish to do well but “greedy hangers on or hungry lackluster characters” around him were only interested in personal benefits.

References 

Nigerian books
Memoirs